Amorphoscelis pallida is a species of praying mantis found in Cameroon and Nigeria.

See also
List of mantis genera and species

References

Amorphoscelis
Mantodea of Africa
Insects described in 1913